The Metropolis of Ioannina (Iera Mitropolis Ioanninon) is a Greek Orthodox diocese centred on the city of Ioannina, in the Epirus of Greece. As one of the "New Lands", it belongs formally to the Patriarchate of Constantinople, but is administered by the Church of Greece. , the Metropolitan of Ioannina is Maximos Papagiannis.

History
The exact time of Ioannina's foundation is unknown. It is commonly identified with an unnamed new, "well-fortified" city, recorded by the historian Procopius (De Aedificiis, IV.1.39–42) as having been built by the Byzantine emperor Justinian I for the inhabitants of ancient Euroia, but archaeological evidence for this is lacking; indeed, early 21st-century excavations have brought to light fortifications dating to the Hellenistic period (4th–3rd centuries BC), the course of which was largely followed by the later Castle of Ioannina.

The name Ioannina appears for the first time in 879, in the acts of the Fourth Council of Constantinople, which refer to one Zacharias, Bishop of Ioannine, a suffragan of Naupaktos. After the Byzantine conquest of Bulgaria, in 1020 Emperor Basil II subordinated the local bishopric to the Archbishopric of Ohrid. In the treaty of partition of the Byzantine lands after the Fourth Crusade, Ioannina was promised to the Venetians, but in the event, it became part of the new principality of Epirus, founded by Michael I Komnenos Doukas.

Following the assassination of the last native ruler, Thomas I Komnenos Doukas by his nephew, Nicholas Orsini, in 1318, the city refused to accept the latter and turned to the Byzantines for assistance. On this occasion, Emperor Andronikos II Palaiologos elevated the city to a metropolitan bishopric, and in 1319 Andronikos II issued a chrysobull conceding wide-ranging autonomy and various privileges and exemptions on its inhabitants. The suffragan sees of the new metropolis in the 14th century are not known, but are likely the same four sees as those attested for : the bishoprics of Vela, Dryinoupolis, Bouthrotos/Glyky, and Himarra.

Under the regime of Thomas II Preljubović (1367–1384), the citizens and the local Church suffered greatly: Thomas confiscated property in favour of his Serb followers, and drove the Metropolitan Sebastianos to exile; nevertheless, he was able to repel successive attempts by the Albanian chieftains Peter Losha and John Bua Spata to capture the city, most notably the great surprise attack of 1379, whose failure the Ioannites attributed to intervention by their patron, Saint Michael. After Thomas' murder in December 1384, the citizens of Ioannina offered their city to Esau de' Buondelmonti. Esau took care to recall those exiled under Thomas, including the Metropolitan Gabriel, and restore the properties confiscated by him. Esau secured a period of peace for the city, which lasted until his death in 1411. The Ioannites then invited the Count palatine of Cephalonia and Zakynthos, Carlo I Tocco, as their new ruler. Following the death of Carlo I in 1429, in October 1430 Ioannina surrendered to an Ottoman army.

Led by the Metropolitan, the notables of the city secured a charter, the "Order of Sinan Pasha" (ὁρισμὸς τοῦ Σινᾶν πασᾶ), which outlined the privileges of the city: the church bells would continue to be tolled, no mosques were to be erected, and the authority of the Metropolitan and the possessions of the Church were to be respected. This privileged position lasted until 1611, when the city was engulfed by the peasant revolt led by Dionysius the Philosopher, the Metropolitan of Larissa. In its aftermath, Christians were evicted from the Ioannina Castle, and Muslim and Jewish families settled in their stead. The residence of the Metropolitan was moved from the Castle to the Church of St. Athanasios, where it remains to this day (the church was rebuilt in 1832 after it was gutted in a fire in 1820). The original cathedral of the city, which lay in the southeastern part of the Castle, survived at least until 1430, but is recorded as being ruined by 1596/97. Columns from it were reused in the Fethiye Mosque, built by Ali Pasha in 1795.

A separate bishopric for the region Zagori was established from the Metropolitan's jurisdiction in the late 16th century, but it was disestablished soon after. Its seat was probably the Rongovou Monastery. In 1659, Sultan Ahmed III established the Exarchate of Metsovo as a special privilege for the villages of the region of Metsovo. The exarchate was under the direct jurisdiction of the Patriarch of Constantinople, and lasted until 1795. Following the Asia Minor Disaster and the Greco-Turkish population exchange, in 1924 a separate Metropolis of Metsovo was established for the provisional settlement of bishops evicted from Asia Minor. Its first and only metropolitan was the former Metropolitan of Ganos and Chora, Timotheos (1924–1928).

Bishops
Apart from Bishop Zacharias in 879, no incumbent of the see is known by name prior to its raising to metropolitan status. From the 14th century, the episcopal list is as follows:

References

Sources 
 
 
 

Dioceses of the Ecumenical Patriarchate of Constantinople
Epirus
Eastern Orthodox dioceses in Greece
Ioannina
Ioannina